Mystery is an EP by South African indie rock band Blk Jks. It was released on March 10, 2009, on Secretly Canadian Records, and is the band's debut release.

Critical reception
Mystery received generally favorable reviews from music critics. According to Metacritic, based on 7 reviews, the EP has a score of 80 out of 100, indicating "generally favorable reviews".

Track listing

References

BLK JKS albums
2009 EPs
Secretly Canadian EPs